Alpinist is a quarterly American magazine focused on mountain literature and mountaineering ascents worldwide.

History and profile 
Alpinist was founded in 2002 and was originally published out of Jackson, Wyoming. It was resurrected in 2009, and is now based in Jeffersonville, Vermont.

The magazine often focuses on "fast and light" ascents and advocates a rigorous clean-climbing style (not leaving gear behind).

Alpinist won the Maggie Award for Best Overall Design/Consumer Category from the Western Publication Association (WPA) for its Autumn issue (Issue 8) in 2005, and the Maggie Award for the Best Quarterly/Consumer Division in April 2004 for its Winter 2003–2004 issue (Issue 5).

On October 16, 2008 the magazine announced that it was closing operations due to financial problems. The magazine was re-launched on April 15, 2009, with Michael Kennedy as the new Editor-in-Chief, by Height of Land Publications, home of Telemark Skier and Backcountry magazines.

In May 2012, Kennedy was replaced as editor-in-chief by longtime contributing editor Katie Ives.

Over the years, notable Alpinist contributors have included David Roberts, Steve House, Marko Prezelj, Kyle Dempster, Steve Swenson, Ian Parnell, Hayden Kennedy, Pat Deavoll, Dean Potter, Nick Bullock, Andy Kirkpatrick, Marc-Andre Leclerc, Brette Harrington, Sibylle Hechtel, Tamotsu Nakamura, Alex Honnold and Tommy Caldwell.

See also 
 Summit magazine
 Climbing magazine
 Rock & Ice

References

External links
Alpinist website
Alpinist awards from Camp 4 news
writerswrite.net Alpinist entry

2002 establishments in Wyoming
2009 establishments in Vermont
Sports magazines published in the United States
Quarterly magazines published in the United States
Climbing magazines
Magazines established in 2002
Magazines published in Vermont
Magazines published in Wyoming